The Secret History is the first novel by the American author Donna Tartt, published by Alfred A. Knopf in September 1992. Set in New England, the campus novel tells the story of a closely knit group of six classics students at Hampden College, a small, elite liberal arts college located in Vermont based upon Bennington College, where Tartt was a student between 1982 and 1986.

The Secret History is an inverted detective story narrated by one of the six students, Richard Papen, who reflects years later upon the situation that led to the murder of their friend Edmund "Bunny" Corcoran – wherein the events leading up to the murder are revealed sequentially. The novel explores the circumstances and lasting effects of Bunny's death on the academically and socially isolated group of classics students of which he was a part.

The novel was originally titled The God of Illusions, and its first-edition hardcover was designed by the acclaimed New York City graphic designer Chip Kidd, and Barbara de Wilde. A 75,000 print order was made for the first edition (as opposed to the usual 10,000 order for a debut novel) and the book became a bestseller. The book has since been credited as popularizing the growth of the dark academia literary sub-genre.

Synopsis
In 1983, Richard Papen leaves his hometown of Plano, California, to study literature at the elite Hampden College in Vermont. Richard finds he cannot enroll in the classes of the sole Classics professor Julian Morrow, who limits enrollment to a hand-picked clique of five students: fraternal twins Charles and Camilla Macaulay, Francis Abernathy, Henry Winter, and Edmund "Bunny" Corcoran. After Richard helps them with a translation, they give him advice on endearing himself to Julian. Eventually, Richard is accepted into Julian's classes.

Richard enjoys his new status as a member of the clique, but notices several odd behaviors from the others: they seem to constantly suffer small injuries, boil strange plants on the stove, and attempt to hide bloody clothing. The group shares a fervent devotion to Julian, who prevents them from taking courses outside of the Classics department. Though Henry seems to have a strained friendship with Bunny, they spend the winter break together in Rome, while Richard lodges in an unheated warehouse. He nearly dies from hypothermia and pneumonia, but is rescued when Henry returns unexpectedly from Italy.

As 1983 rolls into 1984, tensions between Bunny and the group worsen. Bunny constantly insults the others and begins behaving erratically. Richard learns the truth from Henry: the clique, minus Richard and Bunny (and with Julian's approval), attempted to hold a Dionysian bacchanal in the woods near Francis's country estate. While in a fevered trance, Henry accidentally killed a farmer. Bunny found out by chance and has been blackmailing the group ever since. No longer able to meet Bunny's demands, and fearing that he'll expose them as his mental state deteriorates, Henry slowly convinces the group to kill Bunny. They confront Bunny while hiking, and Henry pushes him into a ravine to his death.

As an unseasonable snowfall causes the manhunt for Bunny to grow much larger than expected, the group struggles to maintain their cover, joining search parties and even attending Bunny's funeral. Though the police presence eventually dies down, the group begins to crack under the strain: Francis's hypochondria worsens, Charles descends into alcoholism and abuses Camilla, Richard becomes addicted to pills, and Henry realizes he has no moral objections to murder. Richard learns that Charles has had sexual relationships with both Camilla and Francis. As Charles becomes even more possessive of his sister, Henry arranges for Camilla to move from their shared apartment to a hotel, further incensing Charles.

Julian receives a misdelivered letter purporting to be from Bunny, detailing the bacchanal murder and Bunny's fear that Henry is plotting to kill him. Though Julian initially dismisses it as a hoax, he realizes the truth when he notices the letterhead from Henry and Bunny's hotel in Rome. Julian flees campus and never returns, disappointing Henry, who sees the act of cowardice as a betrayal of his mentor's professed Greek and Roman virtues.

Charles' alcoholism and enmity towards Henry worsens as Henry begins living with Camilla. When Charles is arrested for drunk driving in Henry's car, Henry fears Charles will turn on and expose the group, while Charles fears that Henry may kill him to keep his silence. Charles barges into Camilla and Henry's hotel room and tries to kill Henry with Francis's gun. Henry disarms Charles during the ensuing struggle, though Richard is shot in the process. As security arrives, Henry professes his love for Camilla and fatally shoots himself. The police report concludes that, in a suicidal fit, Henry inadvertently shot Richard.

With Henry's death, the group disintegrates, and only Richard graduates from Hampden. Francis, though homosexual, is forced by his wealthy grandfather to marry a woman he despises, leading him to attempt suicide, which he survives. Charles flees rehab with a married woman to live in squalid conditions in Texas. Left behind to care for her ailing grandmother, Camilla becomes increasingly isolated, and turns down Richard's proposal of marriage. Richard returns to California and becomes a lonely academic with an unrequited love for Camilla.

The novel ends with Richard recounting a dream meeting Henry in a desolate futuristic museum. After a brief conversation, Henry leaves Richard to contemplate his unhappiness.

Characters

 Julian Morrow: an eccentric classics professor at Hampden who teaches only a small group of students whom he selects for their intellect, connections, and wealth. Julian was a prominent socialite in the 1940s, associated with T. S. Eliot. The independently wealthy Julian donates his salary to Hampden, with which he  has a strained relationship. Julian extols the virtues of Greco-Roman society, and is viewed as a father figure by his students, who are taught nearly exclusively by him.
 Richard Papen: a transfer student of modest means from California, he is insecure with his background and so embellishes it to fit in with his fellow classics students. Richard reluctantly follows Henry's plans but does not put up serious resistance.
 Charles and Camilla Macaulay: Charming, orphaned fraternal twins from Virginia. The complex relationship between the twins is characterized by jealousy and protectiveness. The twins frequently host the group for dinner. Camilla is a love interest of both Richard and Henry.
 Henry Winter: a polyglot intellectual prodigy and published author with wealthy new money parents and a passion for the Pāli canon, Homer, and Plato, he is the unofficial leader of the group and is Julian's favorite student. Despite his intellectual talents, Henry did not graduate high school due to injuries from an accident.
 Francis Abernathy: a generous and hypochondriac student from an old money background, whose secluded country home becomes a sanctuary for the group. Francis has an overprotective mother with a history of drug addiction who sent him to several elite European boarding schools. 
 Edmund "Bunny" Corcoran: a jokester who despite appearances of wealth, is in fact penniless and unabashedly takes advantage of his friends. Bunny's bigoted attitudes such as anti-Catholicism antagonize other group members. Bunny is the least academically talented of the group; he has severe dyslexia and did not read until age 10. Unlike other group members, Bunny has a girlfriend and friends outside of the group.
 Dr. Roland: a doddering old professor of psychology, for whom Richard works as a research assistant.
 Georges Laforgue: a professor of French, and Richard’s first academic advisor.
 Judy Poovey: one of Richard's dormmates. Also a California native, she has a one-sided sexual infatuation with him, and he only goes to see her when he wants something from her.
 Marion Barnbridge: Bunny’s girlfriend, who for one reason or another keeps her distance from the group.
 Cloke Rayburn: a drug dealer, and Bunny's best friend from high school.
 Katherine and Macdonald Corcoran: mother and father of Bunny and his brothers Teddy, Hugh, Patrick, and Brady. Mr. Corcoran, a former Clemson football star, passed on many of his mannerisms to his sons.

Themes
The Secret History partially draws its inspiration on the 5th-century BC Greek tragedy, The Bacchae, by Euripides.

According to Michiko Kakutani, some aspects of the novel are reflective of Nietzsche's model of Apollonian and Dionysian expression in The Birth of Tragedy. Kakutani, writing for the New York Times, said "in The Secret History, Ms. Tartt manages to make...melodramatic and bizarre events (involving Dionysian rites and intimations of satanic power) seem entirely plausible." Because the author introduces the murder and those responsible at the outset, critic A. O. Scott labeled it "a murder mystery in reverse." In 2013, John Mullan wrote an essay for The Guardian titled "Ten Reasons Why We Love Donna Tartt's The Secret History", which includes "It starts with a murder," "It is in love with Ancient Greece," "It is full of quotations," and "It is obsessed with beauty."

Reception
The book received generally positive reviews from critics. Michiko Kakutani called the novel a "ferociously well-paced entertainment", which "succeeds magnificently" and heavily attributed the success of the book to Tartt's well-developed writing skills. Sophie McKenzie, writing for The Independent, called it "the book of a lifetime", stating that it was "perfectly paced" and the characters are "fascinating and powerfully drawn". However, James Wood of the London Review of Books gave it a mediocre review, writing: "The story compels, but it doesn't involve...It offers mysteries and polished revelations on every page, but its true secrets are too deep, too unintended to be menacing or profound." Critic Ted Gioia wrote:There is much to admire in Tartt's novel, but it is especially laudable for how persuasively she chronicles the steps from studying classics to committing murder. This is a difficult transition to relate in a believable manner, and all the more difficult given Tartt's decision to tell the story from the perspective of one of the most genial of the conspirators.  Her story could easily come across as implausible—or even risible—in its recreation of Dionysian rites on a Vermont college campus, and its attempt to convince us that a mild-mannered transfer student with a taste for ancient languages can evolve, through a series of almost random events, into a killer. Yet convince us she does, and the intimacy with which Tartt brings her readers into the psychological miasma of the unfolding plot is one of the most compelling features of The Secret History.

Planned and cancelled screen adaptations
The novel has been tapped by several filmmakers in the decades since its release for a possible film or television adaptation; however, all have been unsuccessful. 

Producer Alan J. Pakula first acquired film rights at the book's publishing in 1992, with a planned screenplay by writers Joan Didion and John Gregory Dunne. Work was set to begin in late 1998 (director Scott Hicks was rumored to have already been hired) when Pakula's death in a car accident in November caused the project to fall through.

The 2002 publication of Tartt's second novel The Little Friend caused a resurgence of interest in The Secret History. A new adaptation was announced by Miramax Films, to be produced by Harvey Weinstein and headed by siblings Jake and Gwyneth Paltrow, who hoped to star as the characters Charles and Camila Macaulay respectively. The death of the siblings' father Bruce Paltrow in October of that year caused the project to be shelved again, and the rights were reinstated to Tartt.

At the 2013 publication of Tartt's third novel The Goldfinch, interest in another adaptation was rekindled, this time for television with Tartt's school peers Melissa Rosenberg and Bret Easton Ellis at the helm (Ellis is the novel's co-dedicatee). This attempt also fell through after Rosenberg and Ellis failed to find a network or streaming platform interested in the project.

Tartt's unhappiness with the 2019 film version of The Goldfinch caused many to speculate she would not allow further screen adaptations of any of her novels, leaving The Secret History in limbo. Tartt fired her longtime agent Amanda Urban over the film and stated, "Once the book is out there, it’s not really mine anymore, and my own idea isn’t any more valid than yours. And then I begin the long process of disengaging."

Notes

References

External links
NPR: Talk of the Nation: Donna Tartt interviewed by Lynn Neary (November 5, 2002)
NPR: Talk of the Nation: Donna Tartt and Anne Rice interviewed by Ray Suarez (October 30, 1997)
Esquire: The Secret Oral History of Bennington: The 1980s' Most Decadent College: The prototypes of The Secret History's characters interviewed by Lili Anolik (May 28, 2019)

1992 American novels
Campus novels
Alfred A. Knopf books
Novels with gay themes
Incest in fiction
Psychological novels
Secret histories
1990s LGBT novels
Novels set in Vermont
Books with cover art by Chip Kidd
American LGBT novels
1992 debut novels